James Longenbach (Sept. 17, 1959 – July 29, 2022) was an American critic and poet.  His early critical work focused on modernist poetry, namely that of Ezra Pound, W.B. Yeats, and Wallace Stevens, but came to include contemporary poetry as well. Longenbach published six books of poems: Threshold (1998), Fleet River (2003), Draft of a Letter (2007), the iron key (2012), earthling (2017), and forever (2021). His book of criticism, The Resistance to Poetry, has been described as a "compact and exponentially provocative book."

Longenbach was Joseph Henry Gilmore Professor of English at the University of Rochester and taught at the University from 1985 until his death in 2022. His poems also appeared in many magazines and journals, including The New Yorker, The New Republic, The Nation, and The Yale Review, as well as The Best American Poetry 1995 anthology. Longenbach frequently reviewed books for Boston Review, The Nation, and the Los Angeles Times Book Review.

Longenbach received his bachelor's degree in 1981 from Trinity College in Hartford, Connecticut and subsequently received his Ph.D. from Princeton University. His wife, novelist Joanna Scott (and fellow Trinity graduate), teaches at the English Department of the University of Rochester. They have two children.

Bibliography
 Modernist Poetics of History: Pound, Eliot, and the Sense of the Past (1987)
 Stone Cottage: Pound, Yeats & Modernism (1988; Oxford University Press)
 Ezra Pound’s Poetry and Prose: Contributions to Periodicals in Ten Volumes (1991) (co-editor)
 Wallace Stevens: The Plain Sense of Things (1991; Oxford University Press)
 Modern Poetry After Modernism (1997; Oxford University Press)
 Threshold: Poems (1998; University of Chicago Press)
 Fleet River: Poems (2003; University of Chicago Press)
 The Resistance to Poetry (2005; University of Chicago Press)
 Draft of a Letter: Poems (Apr. 2007; University of Chicago Press)
 The Art of the Poetic Line (Dec. 2007; Graywolf Press)
 the iron key: poems (2012; W.W. Norton & Company)
 earthling: poems (2017; W.W. Norton & Company)
 How Poems Get Made (2018; W.W. Norton & Company)
 The Lyric Now (2020; University of Chicago Press)
 forever: poems (2021; W.W. Norton & Company)

References

External links
 Official Website of James Longenbach
 Longenbach in conversation with Jesse Lichtenstein at Loggernaut.
 Longenbach in conversation with Louise Glück for the Lannan Foundation.
 Fairchild Award presented to James Longenbach, from University of Rochester public relations, October 2004

American literary critics
American male poets
University of Rochester faculty
Writers from Rochester, New York
Living people
Journalists from New York (state)
American male non-fiction writers
1959 births